The 1936 Gonzaga Bulldogs football team was an American football team that represented Gonzaga University during the 1936 college football season. In their sixth year under head coach Mike Pecarovich, the Bulldogs compiled a 5–3 record and outscored all opponents by a total of 98 to 73.

Fullback George Karamatic led the team's offense and received first-team honors from both the Associated Press and United Press on the 1936 All-Pacific Coast football team. Karamatic later played in the National Football League for the Washington Redskins.

Schedule

References

Gonzaga
Gonzaga Bulldogs football seasons
Gonzaga Bulldogs football